Porcellio scaber lusitanus is a subspecies of Porcellio scaber endemic to Spain and Portugal. Described in 1907 as Porcellio lusitanus the species was latter lowered to a subspecies level despite being referred to as a form. It is highly likely that Porcellio scaber lusitanus are normal P. scaber with Allometric Growth.

Description 
Porcellio scaber lusitanus is large, typically measuring around 15-20mm in length. It has a dark gray coloration, with a granulated, glossy exoskeleton. The subspecies is characterized by its large size and pronounced cone-shaped granulation.

Habitat and distribution 
Porcellio scaber lusitanus is endemic to Spain and Portugal, where it is found in a variety of habitats, including forests, grasslands, and rocky areas. The subspecies is found on the Iberian Peninsula, and is particularly common in the western and southwestern regions of the Peninsula. The subspecies has a dense population in Porto, Portugal.

Ecology and behavior 
Porcellio scaber lusitanus is a detritivore, feeding on a wide range of dead plant material, including leaves, twigs, and bark.

Development and maternal care 
Like all species of Isopoda Porcellio scaber lusitanus directly develops from yolky eggs. Both the eggs and juveniles develop within a brood pouch called a marsupium until the first juvenile stage. The use of the marsupium eliminates the need for an external water source for early development since it is filled with fluid from the mother isopod.

Conservation status 
Porcellio scaber lusitanus is not considered to be a threatened species, and is not listed by the International Union for Conservation of Nature (IUCN) Red List. However, it may be affected by habitat loss and degradation due to human activities, such as urbanization and agriculture. However, the subspecies is considered to be rare, with limited populations found in specific areas. Habitat destruction and degradation, as well as pollution, are believed to be the main threats facing the species. Further research is needed to determine the conservation status of P. s. lusitanus and to develop appropriate conservation measures.

Taxonomy and nomenclature 
Porcellio scaber lusitanus was first described in 1907 by Verhoeff as Porcellio lusitanus, but was later reclassified as a subspecies of Porcellio scaber. The subspecies name lusitanus refers to Lusitania, the Roman province that covered present-day Portugal and part of Spain.

Relationships with humans 
Porcellio scaber lusitanus is kept in the Isopod Hobby under the name Porcellio scaber "Lava". The cultivar was collected from the border of Portugal and Spain and bred with Porcellio scaber scaber from Europe to form a uniquely colored mutation. The original American line was imported by Alan Grosse. A common misconception is that this cultivar is co-dominant. It is actually a single trait with highly variable expression. That is why there is so much variation in 'Lava' colonies compared to a less variable morph like 'Dalmatian'. The splotched marking with red and black is dominant. Therefore, isopods only need one copy of the gene for it to show, meaning it will show up in the first generation of any lava X non-lava cross, whereas recessive traits won't show up until the second generation.

References 

Fauna of Portugal
Fauna of Spain
Insects described in 1907
Porcellionidae